The CANAMEX corridor is a series of improvements to freeways and other transportation infrastructure linking Canada to Mexico through the United States. The corridor was established under the North American Free Trade Agreement.
Currently the corridor is defined by a series of highways. However, the corridor is also proposed for use by railroads and fiber optic telecommunications infrastructure.

Origin
While the tri-lateral corridor was defined in NAFTA, the U.S. portion of CANAMEX Trade Corridor was outlined in 1991 in the "ISTEA" highway bill, and defined by Congress in the 1995 National Highway Systems Designation Act, Public Law 104-59, November 28, 1995.

Route description
The CANAMEX corridor is defined by the numbered highway designations along its length:

Canada
British Columbia
Highway 97 (Alaska Highway)
Highway 2 - Dawson Creek to Alberta border
Alberta
Highway 43 - British Columbia border to Highway 16
Highway 16 - to Edmonton
Highway 216 through Edmonton
Highway 2 - Edmonton to Calgary
Highway 201 through Calgary
Highway 2 - Calgary to Fort Macleod
Highway 3 - Fort Macleod to Lethbridge
Highway 4 - Lethbridge to Sweetgrass–Coutts Border Crossing (Continues as Interstate 15)

United States
Montana - Interstate 15
Idaho - Interstate 15
Utah - Interstate 15
Arizona - Interstate 15 - Utah border to Nevada border across Arizona's northwest corner
Nevada
Interstate 15 - Utah border to Las Vegas
U.S. Route 93 -Las Vegas to Arizona state line, this portion has been upgraded to Interstate Highway standards with the added designations:
Interstate 515 - Las Vegas to Henderson
Interstate 11 - Henderson to Arizona border 
Arizona
U.S. Route 93  - Nevada border to Wickenburg
 Proposed to be upgraded to Interstate Highway standards and re-designated Interstate 11
U.S. Route 60 - Wickenburg to Surprise (makes the highway drivable as a continuous route though it is not officially included) 
Arizona State Route 303 - Surprise to Goodyear (Bypasses surface streets, not officially included)
Interstate 10 - Goodyear to Tucson 
Interstate 19 - Tucson to Nogales, Arizona
 Arizona State Route 189 - Nogales, AZ to Mexico–United States border

Mexico
Nogales, Sonora - Mexico City - Mexico Federal Highway 15D

Highway
The United States portion of the highway was established as a High Priority Corridor.  The treaty establishes that the CANAMEX highway will be upgraded to at least 4 lanes along its entire length. In 2008, 84% of the highway in the United States was compliant, and 86% of the highway in Mexico was compliant.

When the corridor was first approved, two bottlenecks were identified with the Arizona portion of the corridor that required significant infrastructure to address. The first was the route of U.S. Route 93 across northwestern Arizona, which then included a slow route with numerous hairpin curves over the Hoover Dam. The Hoover Dam Bypass opened on October 16, 2010, resolving that issue.

The second issue was a gap near Phoenix. The official designation is Interstate 10 to U.S. Route 93 at Phoenix. However, US 93 does not enter Phoenix or connect with I-10. US 93 currently terminates at Wickenburg, northwest of Phoenix. To make the connection originally required driving U.S. Route 60, a surface street through the western suburbs of Phoenix that was not compliant with the standards established by the treaty. The chosen alternative for resolution involved creating a compliant connection between Wickenburg and Phoenix via upgrades and extensions to Arizona State Route 303. Most of the upgrades have been completed, with the final phase expected to be complete by the end of 2016. A second proposal has since been made for a freeway connection between Las Vegas, Nevada, and Casa Grande, Arizona, Interstate 11, that would in its course connect Wickenburg to Phoenix.

Railroad
NAFTA also established the CANAMEX corridor for rail usage. While most of the corridor is paralleled by existing rail lines, there is no existing contiguous line that follows the entire corridor, and through rail traffic from Canada to Mexico would have to use alternate corridors for at least parts of the journey. The Union Pacific Railroad owns and operates a rail line following the corridor between Nogales, Sonora, Mexico, and Phoenix, Arizona, acquired from the former Southern Pacific Railroad. There is no railroad directly connecting and Phoenix and Las Vegas, Nevada, but it is possible to route trains between those cities via Barstow, California along tracks owned by Arizona and California Railway and/or BNSF Railway. The Union Pacific again owns tracks following the I-15 portion of the corridor from Las Vegas, to Butte, Montana, acquired from the former Los Angeles and Salt Lake Railroad and Oregon Short Line.  No line directly follows the corridor between Butte and Helena, Montana, but it is possible to route trains between those cities via a combination of BNSF Railway and Montana Rail Link lines. North of Helena, BNSF owns lines that closely follow the CANAMEX corridor, including a connection with the Canadian Pacific Railway at Coutts, Alberta, Canada, acquired from the former Great Northern Railway.

See also
 Pan-American Highway
 CanAm Highway

References

External links
CANAMEX Corridor website

Trilateral relations of Canada, Mexico, and the United States
Transport in North America